The Washington D.C. Area Film Critics Association Award for Best Director is an annual award given by the Washington D.C. Area Film Critics Association.

Winners

2000s

2010s

2020s

See also
Academy Award for Best Director

References

Director, Best
Awards for best director